Roxbury Crossing station is a rapid transit station in Boston, Massachusetts. It serves the MBTA Orange Line, and is located on Tremont Street in the Mission Hill neighborhood. The current station opened in 1987 as part of the renovation and relocation of the southern Orange Line. Like all stations on the Orange Line, Roxbury Crossing is accessible.

History
On June 21, 1831, the Boston and Providence Railroad was incorporated, and was chartered the next day to build a rail line between its two namesake cities; construction began in late 1832, and the B&P opened from Park Square to Canton in 1834, with intermediate stations at Readville and Roxbury Crossing (the remaining section of the B&P main line, from Canton to Providence, opened the following year with the completion of the Canton Viaduct).  

Originally, the station (along with the entire B&P main line north of Readville) was at ground level. Starting in 1891, the Old Colony Railroad (which had acquired the B&P in 1888, and was itself acquired in 1893 by the New York, New Haven and Hartford Railroad) raised the section of its main line through Roxbury and Jamaica Plain (extending from Massachusetts Avenue to the current location of Forest Hills station) onto a 4-track stone embankment to eliminate dangerous grade crossings. The project involved the building of five new stations in Roxbury and Jamaica Plain; the existing stations at Roxbury Crossing, Jamaica Plain, and Forest Hills were replaced with new elevated stations, while two additional commuter stations were built at Heath Street and Boylston Street. The new Roxbury Crossing station opened on June 1, 1897, along with the other four new stations.

Although the five NYNH&H stations in Roxbury and Jamaica Plain continued to operate for over three decades following the southward extension of the Washington Street Elevated, they were ultimately unable to compete with the Elevated, and Roxbury Crossing, along with the other four stations, was closed on September 29, 1940 due to a lack of passengers.

In the 1960s, plans took hold to extend I-95 into downtown Boston along the NYNH&H's right-of-way and to replace the Washington Street Elevated (from 1967 known as the Orange Line) with a rapid transit line running in the new highway's median; these plans led to the demolition of hundreds of homes (including the virtual obliteration of the Roxbury Crossing neighbourhood) and the clearing of a long strip of land (the Southwest Corridor) extending through Roxbury and Jamaica Plain all the way up to Green Street, before the project was halted by highway revolts in 1969 and the February 11, 1970 announcement by Governor Francis W. Sargent of a moratorium on new highway construction within the Route 128 corridor, and eventually cancelled by Governor Sargent in 1972.

The cleared strip of land was eventually developed into the Southwest Corridor Park, and the Orange Line was moved to a new alignment along the Corridor in 1987 despite the cancellation of the project originally calling for its relocation.  This included a new rapid transit station at Roxbury Crossing, on the site of the former NYNH&H station; the Washington Street Elevated was permanently closed on April 30, 1987, and Roxbury Crossing station, along with the eight other new stations on the southern Orange Line, opened four days later. Several bus routes which formerly ended at Dudley Square were extended to the new Ruggles station, with a connection to Roxbury Crossing station at the intersection of Tremont Street and Columbus Avenue.

The entire Orange Line, including Roxbury Crossing station, was closed from August 19 to September 18, 2022, during maintenance work. The MBTA plans to modify bus stops at the station in 2024 as part of the construction of bus lanes on Columbus Avenue and Tremont Street. The bus stops for route 66 on Tremont Street will be improved, while the stops for routes 22 and 29 on Columbus Avenue will be removed (as those routes have transfers to the Orange Line at Jackson Square and Ruggles).

Bus connections

Roxbury Crossing station is served by seven MBTA bus routes and one community bus route:
:  or Kane Square–
: –Ruggles station via Talbot Ave
: Ashmont station–Ruggles station via Washington Street
: –Ruggles station
: Jackson Square station–Ruggles station
: Franklin Park–Ruggles station
: Harvard Square–
: Mission Hill LINK
The Mission Hill Link runs on Parker Road to the west.

References

External links

MBTA - Roxbury Crossing
 Tremont Street entrance from Google Maps Street View

Orange Line (MBTA) stations
Railway stations in Boston
Railway stations in the United States opened in 1987
Roxbury, Boston
Stations along Old Colony Railroad lines
Stations along Boston and Providence Railroad lines